Matthew Barton (born 16 December 1991) is an Australian professional tennis player. He made his Grand Slam singles debut at the 2016 Wimbledon Championships reaching the second round.

Personal
Barton grew up on the Northern Beaches of Sydney. He attended St Luke's Grammar School.

Professional career

2012
Barton won his first ITF Futures title defeating Samuel Groth in the final 7–6(3) 6–3.

Barton played the 2013 Australian Open Wildcard Playoff defeating Thanasi Kokkinakis and Nick Kyrgios.

2013
Barton defeated Croatian Ivo Karlović 6–7(0) 7–6(5) 7–6(5) at the Apia International Sydney qualification, Then beat Tatsuma Ito 7–5 6–1. Before losing to Björn Phau of Germany.

Barton reached the 2nd round of the Australian Open with John Millman defeating Marinko Matosevic and Daniel Gimeno-Traver in the opening round. Before losing to Kevin Anderson and Jonathan Erlich.

Barton won his first ATP Challenger Tour Title in West Lakes defeating the number 2 British player James Ward in the final 6–2 6–3.

Barton lost round 1 of qualification at the French Open, Wimbledon and lost to Donald Young at the US Open. He ended 2013 with a ranking of 253.

2014
Barton lost in round 1 of qualification at the 2014 Brisbane International, 2014 Apia International Sydney and 2014 Australian Open in January, before returning to the Challenger and Futures circuit in Australia and Croatia. He ended 2014 with a ranking of 524.

2015
Barton played Challengers and Futures in 2015, making three finals and winning two of them. He ended 2015 with a ranking of 299.

2016
Barton commenced 2016 by qualifying for the Auckland ASB Classic defeating Denis Kudla 6-2 6-0. In Main Draw he beat Steve Johnson first round 6–3 3–6 6–3, this was his first ever ATP Tour level win. He then lost second round to top seed and world number 6 David Ferrer in straight sets. Barton qualified for Houston defeating Reilly Opelka in straight sets. He defeated Francis Tiafoe in the opening round before losing to defending champion Jack Sock second round. At Roland Garros he lost in qualifying to Radek Stepanek 6-3 2-6 5-7.  In June, Barton went on to qualify for his first main draw grand slam event at 2016 Wimbledon Championships, defeating Karen Khachanov in the final round of qualifying 7-6(1) 6-7(1) 6-2 6-3. In the main draw, Barton recorded his first ever grand slam victory over Frenchman Albano Olivetti in 5 sets 6–7(7) 7–6(5) 6–3 6–7(5) 14–12. Barton was defeated by John Isner second round 6–7(8) 6–7(3) 6-7(8).
Barton defeated Nikoloz Basilashvili at the 2016 US Open qualifying 6-7(3) 6-2 7-6(6).
Barton ended 2016 with a ranking of 197.

2017
In January, Barton qualified for the 2017 Apia International Sydney by defeating Mikhail Kukushkin. He upset Kyle Edmund in the opening round on centre court 7–6(3) 7–6(5). Before losing to eventual champion Gilles Muller in the second round 1-6 6-3 4-6.

Professional career finals

Singles: 4 (5–1)

Grand Slam performance timeline

References

External links

Australian male tennis players
Tennis players from Sydney
1991 births
Living people
21st-century Australian people